The Common Core Booster (CCB) is an American rocket stage, which is used as the first stage of the Atlas V rocket as part of its modular design. It was also intended that two additional CCBs would be used as boosters on the Atlas V Heavy, however this configuration has not been developed. Use of a Common Core Booster as the first stage of the Japanese GX was also planned; however, this program was cancelled in late 2009.

Testing of the CCB and its RD-180 engines was conducted in the United States at the Marshall Space Flight Center, and in Khimki, Russia. The test programme concluded with the final engine test in December 2001. The first launch of a Common Core Booster was the maiden flight of the Atlas V, which was launched from Space Launch Complex 41 at the Cape Canaveral Air Force Station on 21 August 2002. As of November 2020, the Atlas V has made 86 flights, all of which have used a single Common Core Booster.

See also
 Universal Rocket Module, the Russian Angara common core.
 Falcon Heavy, the SpaceX Falcon 9 multi-core variant.

References

Atlas (rocket family)
Rocket stages